The Namdharis (Gurmukhi: ਨਾਮਧਾਰੀ; Devanagari: नामधारी; nāmadhārī, meaning "bearers of the name"), also known as Kuka (Gurmukhi: ਕੂਕਾ; kūkā [sg]; ਕੂਕੇ; kūkē [pl]: from Punjabi kuk, “scream” or “cry”), are a Sikh sect that differs from mainstream Sikhs chiefly in that it believes that the lineage of Sikh Gurus did not end with Guru Gobind Singh (1666–1708), as they recognize Balak Singh (1797–1862) as the 11th Guru of the Sikh religion, thus continuing the succession of Sikh Gurus through the centuries from Guru Nanak Dev to the present day. The 12th Guru was Ram Singh (1816–1885), who moved the sects centre to Bhaini Sahib (Ludhiana) and is regarded as the first Indian to use non-cooperation and non-violence boycott in order to combat the British Empire in India.

Beliefs

Namdharis, also known as Kuka Sikhs, believe that the line of Sikh Gurus did not end with Guru Gobind Singh, as they claim that he did not die in Nanded but escaped and lived in secret, and secretly helped the Khalsa in the coming decades under the guise of a man named Ajaypal Singh. and that he nominated Balak Das Udasi to be the 11th Guru, a tradition that was continued through the Namdhari leaders. According to their beliefs, Guru Gobind Singh passed guruship to Satguru Balak Das of Hazro, Punjab in the year 1812 on Baisakh Sudi 10. before passing on Jeth Sudi 5, Vikrami Samvat 1869 (1812 A.D.), at the apparent age of 146.

They did not believe in any religious ritual other than the repetition of God's name (or nam, for which reason members of the sect are called Namdharis), rejecting the worship of idols, graves, tombs, gods, or goddesses. The Namdharis had more of a social impact than the Nirankaris at the time of its founding due to the fact that they emphasized Khalsa identity, seeking to reestablish it, and the authority of the Guru Granth Sahib, as well as their clashes with the British colonial authority. They call their houses of worship dharamsalas, though they freely attend other gurdwaras, maintaining family and friendship ties across sect lines.

Their 12th Guru was Ram Singh, who moved the sect's center to Bhaini Sahib (Ludhiana). A Tarkhan or Ramgharia, his rural sect would be composed largely of Ramgharias and poorer Jat Sikhs. He was strictly vegetarian and a strong opponent of cow slaughter, and retaliated against Muslims for killing cows in 1872.  Ram Singh Kuka was arrested by the British and he was exiled to Rangoon, Myanmar. Dozens of Namdharis were arrested by the British and executed without trial in Ludhiana and Ambala. They consider Guru Granth Sahib and Dasam Granth as equally important, and compositions from the Chandi di Var are a part of their daily Nitnem. They circumambulate the fire (havan) during their weddings, but they differ in that the hymns are those from the Adi Granth.

Practices

The Namdharis wear homespun white turbans, which they wrap around their heads (sidhi pagri). They are called Kuka, which means "crier, shouter", for their ecstatic religious practices during devotional singing. They also meditate, using mala (rosary). Some texts refer to them as Jagiasi or Abhiasi.

Namdharis follow a strict lacto-vegetarian diet and have quoted verses from the Guru Granth Sahib endorsing vegetarianism, they also advocate for cow protection. They abstain from the use of alcohol, caffeine and tobacco.

Role in Indian freedom movement
Some Namdharis are recognized as freedom fighters due to their attacks on cow slaughters, inflicting many deaths of innocent Muslims in Amritsar and Ludhiana in Vikrami Samvat 1928 at midnight on 15 July 1871. The British had instituted a slaughter house near the Golden Temple Amritsar on 5 May 1849. Four Namdhari Sikhs — Bhai Lehna Singh, Bhai Fateh Singh, Bhai Hakam Singh Patwari, Bhai Beehla Singh took it upon themselves to kill Muslims in retaliation for the slaughtering of cows. As a result, the mentioned Namdharis were sentenced to death by hanging at Ram Bagh, Amritsar, where at present, a Namdhari Shaheedi Samarak (memorial) is placed in their honor. They had tried to blame the Nihang Panth for the action by placing a Blue Dummala and Chakrams outside the site of action.

A group of 66 Namdhari Sikhs were executed by cannons on 17–18 January 1872 after a group of 125 attacked a slaughterhouse in Malerkotla. Satguru Ram Singh was sent to Allahabad with his servant (Nanu Singh) on 18 January 1872, in the morning hours from Ludhiana by a special train. On 10 March 1872, Satguru Ram Singh was shifted to Calcutta. On 11 March 1872 he was sent to Rangoon in British Burma. Satguru Ram Singh was kept there until 18 September 1880, and then shifted to Megui in Burma, in an attempt to make contact with him more difficult. Even in exile, Satguru Ram Singh worked endlessly to keep the freedom struggle alive even sending his Suba (Lieutenant) Bishan Singh to Moscow, in order to gain the support of Czar Nicholas II of Russia, in removing British rule in India. Suba Bishan had made contact with Maharaja Duleep Singh who was also in Moscow at the time looking to gain support of the Russian Czar in order to expel the British from India, and re-institute the once flourishing Sikh Empire. However, due to the Russian-Turkish War (1877-1878) the Russians were not keen on supporting any Indian nationalist in going to war against the British Empire. Afterwards many Sikhs and Nihangs killed Namdharis and 180 Namdharis and 12 Nihangs died in the clashes. Ram Singh died in 1885 according to British records, though many Namdharis maintain a belief that he is alive and will reappear.

Interestingly, H.A. Rose notes -

'For the formal declaration of Sir Donald Freill McGregor's authority, Sadagur Hari Singh Kooka was going to announce him as the 'Representative of the one, true Isa (Jesus) in the world and parallel Sadgur of Wahagoor (Waheguru)'.

Afterwards Namdharis joined the British ranks in such amounts that the Kashmir State made a separate Namdhari Regiment which was terminated due to the forces being less powerful and expenses being more than they were worth as they refused to wear better uniforms and, due to fear of death, they refused to fight the Nazis.

Sant Khalsa (Saint Khalsa) 

He administered Khande di Pahul (Amrit Sanchar) to 5 Sikhs: Kahn Singh Nihang of village Chak, Labh Singh Ragi of Amritsar, Atma Singh of Alo Muhar village, Bhai Naina Singh Wariyah, and Sudh Singh of village Durgapur. Afterwards, several people from the congregation took amrit. It is noted within the Kuka British Archives as well as Giani Gian Singh's Panth Parkash that within 10 years Satguru Ram Singh baptized over 100000 people with amrit. The followers of Satguru Ram Singh and initiates into the Sant Khalsa were known as Namdharis or Kukas.

Succession Crisis 
In 2012, after the death of the fifth guru of the Namdharis, Guru Jagjit Singh, there was controversy surrounding who would succeed him as the next Guru. This was further complicated by the fact that Jagjit had not made it clear who would succeed him. Eventually, Uday Singh (nephew of Guru Jagjit Singh) was announced as the successor but this attracted criticism and controversy within the sectoral community, with other factions vying for Dalip Singh (excommunicated elder brother of Uday Singh) or Chand Kaur (widow of late Guru Jagjit Singh) as the next Guru, others are awaiting for Guru Ram Singh's prophesied return. Chand Kaur, one of the supported claimants to the Guruship, was assassinated in April 2016. There have been violent clashes relating to the crisis between different cliques.

Line of Gurus recognised by Namdharis

Below are the names of the Kuka Gurus followed by Namdhari Sikhs succeeding the mainstream Sikh Gurus:

References

External links
 http://www.sribhainisahib.com
 http://www.kukasikhs.com
 http://namdhari.faithweb.com/

1812 establishments in India
Religions that require vegetarianism
Sikh groups and sects